On June 14, 2015, sheriff's deputies in Greene County, Missouri, United States, found the body of Clauddine "Dee Dee" Blanchard (née Pitre; born May 3, 1967, in Chackbay, Louisiana) face down in the bedroom of her house just outside Springfield, lying on the bed in a pool of blood from stab wounds inflicted several days earlier. There was no sign of her daughter, Gypsy Rose, who, according to Blanchard, had chronic conditions including leukemia, asthma, and muscular dystrophy, and who had the "mental capacity of a 7-year-old due to brain damage" as the result of premature birth.

After reading troubling Facebook posts earlier in the evening, concerned neighbors notified the police, reporting that Dee Dee might have fallen victim to foul play and that Gypsy Rose, whose wheelchair and medications were still in the house, might have been abducted. The following day, police found Gypsy Rose in Wisconsin, where she had traveled with her boyfriend, Nicholas Godejohn, whom she had met online. When investigators announced that she was actually an adult and did not have any of the physical and mental health issues which her mother claimed she had, public outrage over the possible abduction of a disabled girl gave way to shock and some sympathy for Gypsy Rose.

Further investigation found that some of the doctors who had examined Gypsy Rose had found no evidence of the claimed disorders. One physician suspected that Dee Dee had Munchausen syndrome by proxy, a mental disorder that causes a parent or other caretaker to exaggerate, fabricate, or induce illness in a person under their care to obtain sympathy or attention. Dee Dee had changed her name after her family, who suspected she had poisoned her stepmother, confronted her about how she treated Gypsy Rose. Nonetheless, many people accepted her situation as true, and the two benefited from the efforts of charities such as Children's Mercy Hospital, Habitat for Humanity, Ronald McDonald House, and the Make-A-Wish Foundation.

Dee Dee had been making her daughter pass herself off as younger and pretend to be disabled and chronically ill, subjecting her to unnecessary surgery and medication, and controlling her through physical and psychological abuse. Marc Feldman, an international expert on factitious disorders, stated that this was the first case he had experienced in which an abused child killed an abusive parent. Gypsy Rose pleaded guilty to second-degree murder and is serving a 10-year sentence; after a brief trial in November 2018, Godejohn was convicted of first-degree murder and sentenced to life in prison without the possibility of parole.

Dee Dee's background

Early life and marriage of Dee Dee Blanchard
Dee Dee Blanchard was born Clauddine Pitre in Chackbay, Louisiana, near the Gulf Coast in 1967, and grew up with her family in nearby Golden Meadow. Blanchard was one of five children of Claude Anthony Pitre, Sr. and Emma Lois Gisclair.

Relatives recalled that she had a habit of stealing from her family, which they speculated was a form of retaliation when "things didn't go her way". At some point early in her adult life, she worked as a nurse's aide. The family expressed suspicion that in 1997 she might have killed her own mother by denying her food.

When she was 24, she became pregnant by Rod Blanchard, then 17. They named their daughter Gypsy Rose because Clauddine liked the name Gypsy and Rod was a fan of Guns N' Roses. Shortly before Gypsy Rose's birth in July 1991, the couple separated when Rod realized he "got married for the wrong reasons". He resisted Clauddine's efforts to get him to return, and she took her newborn daughter to live with her family.

Childhood of Gypsy
According to Rod, who remained involved with his daughter at this point, by the time Gypsy was three months old, her mother was convinced that the infant had sleep apnea and began taking her to the hospital where repeated overnight stays with a sleep monitor and other tests found no sign of the condition. Clauddine subsequently became convinced that Gypsy had a wide range of health issues, which she attributed to an unspecified chromosomal disorder. At some point her mother claimed that Gypsy had muscular dystrophy, and made her use a walker.

Gypsy stated that, when she was 7 or 8, she was riding on her grandfather's motorcycle when they were involved in a minor accident where she obtained an abrasion on her knee. Her mother stated that doctors had given her a wheelchair which she would need to use.

Gypsy often went with her parents to Special Olympics events. In 2001, when Dee Dee claimed Gypsy was 8 (she was actually 10), she was named the honorary queen of the Krewe of Mid-City, a child-oriented parade held during Mardi Gras in New Orleans.

Gypsy seems to have stopped going to school after second grade, possibly even as early as kindergarten. Her mother homeschooled her after that, supposedly because her illnesses were so severe; this was later believed to have been an attempt to isolate Gypsy to further her abuse. Gypsy managed to learn to read on her own through the Harry Potter books.

While Gypsy's father Rod had remarried, Clauddine moved in with her father and stepmother. They would later claim that when preparing food for her stepmother, Clauddine would poison it with Roundup weed killer, leading to her own chronic illness during this period. During that time, she was arrested for several minor offenses, including writing bad checks. When the Pitres began to regularly confront her about her treatment of Gypsy and expressed suspicion about her role in her stepmother's health, she left with Gypsy for the New Orleans suburb of Slidell. Her stepmother's health returned to normal shortly afterward.

In Slidell, she and Gypsy lived in public housing; they paid their bills with Rod's child-support payments and public assistance Clauddine had been granted due to her daughter's supposed medical conditions. They spent most of their time visiting various specialists, mostly at Tulane Medical Center and the Children's Hospital of New Orleans, seeking treatment of the illnesses Clauddine claimed Gypsy had, which she now said included hearing and vision problems. While a muscle biopsy found no sign of the muscular dystrophy Clauddine insisted Gypsy had, she was successful in securing treatment for her daughter's other purported issues. After she told doctors Gypsy had seizures every few months, they prescribed anti-seizure medication. Several surgeries were performed on her during this time and Clauddine regularly took Gypsy to the emergency room for minor ailments.

After Hurricane Katrina devastated the area in August 2005, Clauddine and Gypsy left their ruined apartment for a shelter in Covington set up for individuals with special needs. Clauddine said Gypsy's medical records, including her birth certificate, had been destroyed in the flooding. A doctor there from the Ozarks suggested they relocate to her native Missouri, and the next month they were airlifted there.

Move to Missouri
At first Clauddine and Gypsy lived in a rented home in Aurora, in the southwestern area of the state. During their time there, Gypsy was honored by the Oley Foundation, which advocates for the rights of feeding-tube recipients, as its 2007 Child of the Year. In 2008, Habitat for Humanity built them a small home with a wheelchair ramp and hot tub as part of a larger project on the north side of Springfield, to the east, and the two moved there. The story of a single mother with a severely disabled daughter forced to flee Katrina's devastation received considerable local media attention, and the community often pitched in to help the woman who now went by Clauddinnea Blancharde, and whom they knew as Dee Dee.

The outpouring of support included many charitable contributions. In Louisiana, mother and daughter had at most availed themselves of occasional stays in Ronald McDonald Houses during medical appointments; in Missouri, they received free flights to see doctors at Children's Mercy Hospital in Kansas City, free trips to Walt Disney World, and backstage passes to Miranda Lambert concerts (where she was frequently photographed with the singer) via the Make-A-Wish Foundation. Rod Blanchard also continued to make monthly child support payments of $1,200, as well as sending Gypsy gifts and occasionally talking to her on the phone (during one call, on her 18th birthday, he recalls Dee Dee telling him not to mention her daughter's real age since "she thinks she's 14").

Rod and his second wife regularly hoped to get to Springfield and visit, but for a variety of reasons, Dee Dee would change plans. She told her neighbors in Springfield that Gypsy Rose's father was an abusive drug addict and alcoholic who had never come to terms with his daughter's health issues and never sent them any money.

Many people who met Gypsy were charmed by her. Her  height, 
nearly-toothless mouth, large glasses and high, childlike voice reinforced the perception that she had all the problems her mother claimed she did. Gypsy often wore wigs or hats to cover her baldness; her mother regularly shaved Gypsy's head to mimic the hairless appearance of a chemotherapy patient, allegedly telling Gypsy that since her medication would eventually cause her hair to fall out, it was best to shave it in advance. When they left the house, Dee Dee often took an oxygen tank and feeding tube with them; Gypsy was fed the children's liquid nutrition supplement PediaSure well into her 20s.

Dee Dee used physical abuse to control her daughter, always holding her daughter's hand in the presence of others. Whenever Gypsy said something that either suggested she was not genuinely sick or seemed above her purported mental capabilities, Gypsy recalls that her mother would give her hand a very tight squeeze. When the two were alone, Dee Dee would strike her with her open hands or a coat hanger.

Medical interventions continued; Dee Dee had some of Gypsy's saliva glands treated with Botox, then extracted altogether, to control her drooling, which Gypsy later claimed her mother had induced by using a topical anesthetic to numb her gums before doctor visits. The lack of salivary glands coupled with side-effects of the anti-seizure medication she was given caused Gypsy's already few teeth to decay to the point that the majority of her front teeth were extracted and replaced by a bridge. Tubes were implanted in her ears to control her myriad of purported ear infections.

Suspicions of deceptive behavior
Bernardo Flasterstein, a pediatric neurologist who saw Gypsy in Springfield, became suspicious of her muscular dystrophy diagnosis. He ordered MRIs and blood tests, which found no abnormalities. "I don't see any reason why she doesn't walk", he told Dee Dee on a follow-up visit after seeing Gypsy stand and support her own weight. Flasterstein noted that Dee Dee was not a good historian. After contacting Gypsy's doctors in New Orleans, he learned that Gypsy's original muscle biopsy had come back negative, undermining Dee Dee's self-reported diagnosis of muscular dystrophy, as well as her claim that all Gypsy's records had been destroyed by flooding. He suspected the possibility of Munchausen syndrome by proxy. Dee Dee contrived to gain access to Flasterstein's notes and subsequently stopped taking Gypsy to see him.

Flasterstein did not follow up by reporting Dee Dee to social services. He said he had been told by other doctors to treat the pair with "golden gloves" and doubted the authorities would believe him anyway. In 2009, an anonymous caller told the police about Dee Dee's use of different names and birth dates for herself and her daughter, and suggested Gypsy was in better health than claimed. Officers who performed the resulting wellness check accepted Dee Dee's explanation that she used the misinformation to make it harder for her abusive ex-husband to find her and Gypsy, without talking to Rod, and reported that Gypsy seemed to genuinely be mentally disabled. The file was closed.

Growing independence of Gypsy
Dee Dee seems to have at least once forged a copy of her daughter's birth certificate, moving her birth date to 1995 to bolster claims that she was still a teenager; Gypsy said in a later interview that for 15 years she was not sure of her real age. She sometimes also claimed that the original had been destroyed during the post-Katrina flooding. Dee Dee did keep another copy with Gypsy's actual birth date. Her daughter recalls seeing it during one of their hospital visits and becoming confused; Dee Dee told her it was a misprint.

Since 2001, Gypsy had attended science fiction and fantasy conventions, sometimes in costume, since she could blend into their diverse and inclusive communities in her wheelchair. At an event in 2011, she made what may have been an escape attempt that ended when her mother found her in a hotel room with a man she had met online. Again Dee Dee produced the paperwork giving Gypsy's false, younger birth date and threatened to inform the police. Gypsy recalls that afterward, Dee Dee smashed her computer with a hammer and threatened to do the same to her fingers if she ever tried to escape again; she also kept Gypsy leashed and handcuffed to her bed for two weeks. Dee Dee later told Gypsy that she had filed paperwork with the police claiming that Gypsy was mentally incompetent, leading Gypsy to believe that if she attempted to go to the police for help, they would not believe her.

Sometime around 2012, Gypsy, who continued to use the Internet after her mother had gone to bed to avoid her tightened supervision, made contact online with Nicholas Godejohn, a man around her age from Big Bend, Wisconsin (she said they met on a Christian singles group). Godejohn had a criminal record for indecent exposure and a history of mental illness, sometimes reported as dissociative identity disorder. He also had autism spectrum disorder.

In 2014, Gypsy confided to 23-year-old neighbor Aleah Woodmansee, (who, unaware that Gypsy was closer to her own age, considered herself a "big sister"), that she and Godejohn had discussed eloping and had even chosen names for potential children. Gypsy, who had five separate Facebook accounts, and Godejohn flirted online, their exchanges sometimes using BDSM elements, which Gypsy has since claimed was more what he was interested in. Woodmansee tried to talk her out of it, still thinking Gypsy was too young and possibly being taken advantage of by an online sexual predator. She considered Gypsy's plans just "fantasies and dreams and nothing like this would ever really take place." Despite Dee Dee's efforts to prevent her from using the Internet, which went as far as destroying her daughter's phone and laptop, Gypsy maintained contact with Godejohn, who saved printouts of her posts, until 2014.

The next year, Gypsy arranged and also paid for Godejohn to meet her mother in Springfield. Her plan was for him to just casually "bump into" her while she and Dee Dee were at a movie theater, both of them in costume, and apparently strike up a relationship that way, and then later for her to introduce him to her mother. As soon as they did meet in person for the first time, Godejohn says, Gypsy led him to the bathroom, where the two had sex. The two continued their Internet interactions and began developing their plan to kill Dee Dee.

Murder
Godejohn returned to Springfield in June 2015, arriving while Gypsy and her mother were away at a doctor's appointment. After they had returned home and Dee Dee had gone to sleep, he went to the Blanchard house. Gypsy let him in to the home and allegedly gave him duct tape, gloves and a knife with the understanding that he would use it to murder Dee Dee.

Gypsy hid in the bathroom and covered her ears so that she would not have to hear her mother screaming. Godejohn then stabbed Dee Dee 17 times in her back while she was asleep. Afterwards the two had sex in Gypsy's room, and took $4,000 in cash that Dee Dee had been keeping in the house, mostly from her ex-husband's child support checks. They fled to a motel outside Springfield where they stayed for a few days while planning their next move; during that time, they were seen on security cameras at several local stores. Gypsy said at that point she believed the two had managed to get away with their crime.

They mailed the murder weapon back to Godejohn's home in Wisconsin to avoid being caught with it, then took a bus there. Several witnesses who saw the pair on their way to the Greyhound station noted that Gypsy wore a blonde wig and walked unassisted.

Investigation and arrests 
After seeing a concerning Facebook status posted from Dee Dee's account, the Blanchards' friends suspected something was not right. When phone calls went unanswered, several of the friends and neighbors went to the house. While the friends/neighbors knew that the two often left on medical trips unannounced, they saw Dee Dee's modified car still in the driveway, making the explanation of an unannounced trip unlikely. Protective film on the windows made it hard to see inside in the low light. No one answered the door, so the gathered friends called 9-1-1. When the police arrived, they had to wait for a search warrant to be issued before they could enter, but they allowed one of the neighbors present to climb through a window, where he saw that the inside of the house was largely undisturbed, and that all of Gypsy's wheelchairs were still present.

When the warrant was issued, police entered the house and soon found Dee Dee's body. A GoFundMe account was set up to pay for her funeral expenses, and possibly that of Gypsy's. All who knew the Blanchards feared the worst—even if Gypsy had not been harmed, they believed she would be helpless without her wheelchair, medications, and support equipment like the oxygen tanks and feeding tube.

Woodmansee, who was among those gathered on the Blanchards' lawn, told police what she knew about Gypsy and her secret online boyfriend. She showed them the printouts she had saved, which included his name. Based on that information, police asked Facebook to trace the IP address from which the posts to Dee Dee's account had been made. It turned out to be in Wisconsin, and the next day police agencies in Waukesha County raided the Godejohns' Big Bend home. Both he and Gypsy surrendered and were taken into custody on charges of murder and felony armed criminal action.

The news that Gypsy was safe was greeted with relief back in Springfield, where she and Godejohn were soon extradited and held on $1 million bond. But, in announcing the news, Greene County sheriff Jim Arnott warned "things are not always what they appear." The media in Springfield soon reported the truth of the Blanchards' lives: that Gypsy had never been sick and had always been able to walk, but her mother had made her pretend otherwise, using physical abuse to control her. Arnott urged people not to donate any money to the family until investigators learned the extent of the fraud.

Trials
After the disclosure of how Dee Dee had treated Gypsy, sympathy for her as the victim of a violent murder rapidly shifted to her daughter as a long-term victim of child abuse. While the charge of first-degree murder can carry the death penalty under Missouri law or life without parole, county prosecutor Dan Patterson soon announced he would not seek it for either Gypsy or Godejohn, calling the case "extraordinary and unusual". After her attorney obtained her medical records from Louisiana, he secured a plea bargain to second-degree murder for Gypsy. Gypsy was so undernourished up to this point, during the year she was in the county jail, her lawyer told BuzzFeed that she had gained , in contrast to most of his clients who typically lose weight in that situation. In July 2015, she accepted the plea bargain agreement and was sentenced to 10 years in prison.

Godejohn still faced the more severe charge because prosecutors contended that he initiated the murder plot, and both he and Gypsy agreed that he was the one who actually killed Dee Dee. Her plea bargain agreement did not require her to testify against him. In January 2017, his trial was postponed when prosecutors requested a second psychiatric exam; his lawyers contend that he has an intelligence quotient of 82 and is on the autism spectrum, suggesting that he has diminished capacity. He had initially waived his right to a trial by jury, but changed his mind in June of that year.

In December 2017, the judge set Godejohn's trial for November 2018. In their opening statement, prosecutors alleged that Godejohn had deliberated for over a year before the crime, while his lawyers pointed to his autism and said that Gypsy had formulated the crime and their love-struck client had just done as she had asked. The next day, prosecutors showed jurors the text messages, sometimes sexually explicit, that Gypsy and Godejohn shared in the week before the murder, often using various personas, as well as the knife which he had used to commit the murder. In some of the texts, he asked her for details about Dee Dee's room and sleeping habits. These were supplemented by video of his interview with police after his arrest, where he admitted to having killed her.

Gypsy testified on the trial's third day. She said that while she had indeed suggested to Godejohn that he kill Dee Dee to end her mother's abuse, she had also considered getting pregnant by him in the hope that once she was carrying Godejohn's child, Dee Dee would have to accept him. Along with the knife that she eventually gave to Godejohn, she stole baby clothes from Walmart during a shopping trip so she could go ahead with either plan. However, she said, Godejohn never told her what he thought about the pregnancy plan.

After four days, the case was sent to the jury. Jurors had the option of finding Godejohn guilty of one of three murder charges: involuntary manslaughter, second-degree murder or first-degree murder, or not guilty of any of them. After approximately two hours of deliberation, they returned with the verdict and Godejohn was found guilty of first-degree murder and armed criminal action. In February 2019, he was sentenced to life in prison for the murder conviction, the only possible option since prosecutors had declined to seek the death penalty. Godejohn asked Judge David Jones for leniency on the armed criminal action charge, which carries a minimum sentence of only three years, saying that he had fallen "blindly in love" with Gypsy. He received a sentence of 25 years on that charge, which is concurrent with the life sentence.

Jones also denied a motion by Godejohn's lawyer, Dewayne Perry, for a new trial. Perry argued that the jury should not have been allowed to hear that Godejohn had considered raping Dee Dee on the night of the murder, and he also argued that the state's psychologist should not have been allowed to testify while Godejohn's psychologist should have, to establish that he had diminished capacity. The judge, in denying the motion, conceded that an appeals court could find the latter point significant and consider it a reversible error.

Aftermath and reactions

Community response
The Blanchards' neighbors were shocked to learn that Gypsy's illnesses were fabricated. Aleah Woodmansee, whose information about Gypsy's relationship with Godejohn led police to the couple the day after Dee Dee's body was discovered, said she cried out of disbelief upon hearing that Gypsy had never been sick or disabled. Her mother recalled how everyone had accepted Dee Dee's claims without asking for proof, and wondered if the mother and daughter had been secretly laughing at their neighbors' naïveté. Kim Blanchard (no relation), who had called the deputy sheriffs to the house the night before, said, "What have I been believing? How could I have been so stupid?" Over 60 people attended a candlelight vigil for Dee Dee in downtown Springfield the night after the body was discovered.

In a news conference, Sheriff Arnott said of the case "[Springfield is] a giving community, we surround people with love and finances that we believe that needs it. However, a lot of times we are deceived, and I think this is now so true, in this case at hand." Only one of the charities that had helped the Blanchards spoke after the revelations. A spokesman for Habitat for Humanity, whose volunteers had built the Blanchards' house along with others on their street, said, "We are just really, deeply saddened by the whole situation."

Family
Dee Dee's family in Louisiana, who had confronted her about her treatment of Gypsy years before, did not regret her death. Her father, stepmother, and the nephew who first shared details of Gypsy's actual health when she first started using a wheelchair all later said that Dee Dee deserved her fate and Gypsy had been punished as much as she needed to be. None of them would pay for her funeral, and her father and stepmother ultimately flushed her ashes down the toilet.

Rod Blanchard, Gypsy's father, is more forgiving. "I think Dee Dee's problem was she started a web of lies, and there was no escaping after", he told BuzzFeed. "[I]t was like a tornado got started." He was happy the first time that he saw a video of Gypsy walking under her own power.

Gypsy Rose

Gypsy, now serving her sentence in Missouri's Chillicothe Correctional Center, did not talk to the media until after she had made her plea. When she did, she told BuzzFeed reporter Michelle Dean that she had been able to research Munchausen syndrome by proxy on prison computers, and her mother had every symptom. "I think she would have been the perfect mom for someone that actually was sick", she said. She believed Dee Dee's claim that she had cancer, even though she knew she could walk and eat solid food, leading her to assent to the regular head shavings. However, she always hoped that doctors would see through the ruse, and she was frustrated that none besides Flasterstein did.

When Dean asked her what made her want to escape her situation, Gypsy recalled the 2011 incident at the science fiction convention, which made her wonder why she was not allowed to have friends like others of her age. While she said that Godejohn took their idle discussions of murder into reality, she accepts that she committed a crime and has to live with the consequences. Nonetheless, she has said that she hopes to help other abused victims.
 
Victims of Munchausen by proxy abuse often avoid doctors and hospitals in their later lives because of lingering trust issues, according to expert Marc Feldman. According to her family, Dean, and Erin Lee Carr, Gypsy also exhibits at times the same sociopathic manipulative behaviors as her mother, who was for much of her life her only role model. "She is already psychologically really compromised, and she's going to need as much family underpinning and support as she can get", Feldman told Vulture after viewing Carr's documentary Mommy Dead and Dearest, in which he appears. He also points out that post-traumatic stress disorder is likely to be an issue in her continuing development. "I hope they find someone wherever she chooses to settle who is willing to provide supportive psychotherapy."

On June 27, 2022, Gypsy married Ryan Scott Anderson. They have reportedly "split" as of November 2022.

Medical community
Flasterstein, the pediatric neurologist who believed Gypsy was fully capable of walking on her own and wrote in his notes that he suspected Munchausen by proxy, says it was only the second such possible case he had ever come across. He learned of Dee Dee's murder at the hands of Gypsy and her boyfriend later in 2015 when a former nurse emailed him the news story. "Poor Gypsy", he said. "She suffered all those years, and for no reason." He told Dean he wished he could have done more.

Feldman, in talking about Carr's documentary with Vulture, faults Carr for making Flasterstein appear to be the hero of the story. "[H]e had a gross misunderstanding of his obligations as a physician, as well as the legal requirements to report suspected abuse or neglect", Feldman said. The film accepts Flasterstein's claim that he was only required to make a report to Child Protective Services in the latter instance, but according to Feldman once he had included Munchausen by proxy in his list of possible diagnoses, he was obligated to make a report. "This conundrum arises in case after case, where innumerable doctors have evaluated the patient, perhaps had questions they kept to themselves, and just proceeded to treat or make referrals and ditch the case that way."

While a formal diagnosis of Munchausen by proxy for Dee Dee is technically impossible since she is dead, Feldman told the Springfield News-Leader after Gypsy's guilty plea that he could confidently say Dee Dee had it based on what he knew about the case. "Gypsy was infantilized and kept away from her peers", he said. "She was little more than a tool for Dee Dee to navigate through the world the way she wanted to." He said it was "unprecedented" in the 24 years he had been researching the disorder for an abused child to have killed the abusive parent as Gypsy did.

In popular culture

Films
HBO produced the documentary film Mommy Dead and Dearest directed by Erin Lee Carr about the murder and its relationship to Munchausen syndrome by proxy. The film includes interrogation footage and exclusive interviews with Nick Godejohn and incarcerated Gypsy Rose; it premiered on May 15, 2017.

Television
The CBS network talk show Dr. Phil, episode "Mother Knows Best: A Story of Munchausen by Proxy and Murder" featuring interviews with Gypsy Rose, her father and step-mother, premiered on November 21, 2017.

The American Broadcasting Company (ABC) news and information series Good Morning America, segment "Mother of All Murders" aired an exclusive in-prison interview with Gypsy Rose, aired on January 5, 2018.

The ABC network news magazine series 20/20, episode "The Story of Gypsy Blanchard", consisted of Gypsy Rose's first network interview from prison and it also consisted of an interview that was conducted with Nicholas Godejohn.

The Sony Entertainment Television channel series CID aired an episode titled "Death on Social Media" on 13 August 2017, based on the case but the setting for the episode was changed to India; the characters Aria and Aanchal were based on Gypsy and Dee Dee Blanchard respectively.

The Investigation Discovery channel series James Patterson's Murder is Forever episode "Mother of All Murders", season 1, episode 2, premiered on January 29, 2018.

Investigation Discovery also aired a two-hour special documentary titled Gypsy's Revenge. Gypsy Rose is interviewed while she is still incarcerated and during the interview, she describes her relationship with her mother. Gypsy's father, relatives, and friends are all interviewed along with public officials and Nicholas Godejohn.

Love You to Death aired on Lifetime in January 2019, dramatizing the case as "inspired by true events". Marcia Gay Harden starred as the fictionalized version of Dee Dee, Emily Skeggs starred as Gypsy Rose's counterpart, Brennan Keel Cook starred as Nick's counterpart, and Tate Donovan starred as Rod's counterpart. "[W]hen I think about it every teenager wants to murder their parents at some point," Harden told TV Insider.

In 2019 the streaming service  Hulu announced the creation of the true crime series The Act. The 8-episode miniseries is based on Michelle Dean's 2016 BuzzFeed article. Dean is an executive producer and writer for the first season of the series. Joey King was cast as Gypsy Rose, and received an Emmy nomination for her performance; she shaved her head for the role.  Actress Patricia Arquette was cast as Dee Dee, and won an Emmy for her performance. The Act premiered on March 20, 2019.

In the 2019 Netflix web television series The Politician, the characters Infinity Jackson, Ricardo, and Dusty Jackson are respectively based on Gypsy Rose Blanchard, Nicholas Godejohn and Dee Dee Blanchard.

Literature 
The novel Grace Is Gone by Emily Elgar, published in January 2020, follows a fictionalized version of the case set in Cornwall.

Stephanie Wrobel credited Michelle Dean's 2016 Buzzfeed article as one influence on her thriller Darling Rose Gold (March 2020).

See also
 Julie Gregory, an Ohio woman who wrote a memoir in 2003, Sickened, about her mother's Munchausen by proxy abuse of her, which she tried to report to various health professionals
 Wendi Michelle Scott, a Maryland woman with Munchausen by proxy who injected her four-year-old daughter with magnesium in 2007 and was sentenced to prison in 2008
 Murder of Garnett Spears, a boy in Valhalla, New York, whose mother also had Munchausen by proxy, leading her to fatally poison him with table salt in 2014
 Shauna Taylor case, a Florida woman with Munchausen by proxy who deliberately destroyed her child's liver with over-the-counter drugs in 2013

Notes

References

External links
 
 
 
 

2015 murders in the United States
Deaths by person in Missouri
Deaths by stabbing in Missouri
Matricides
Murder in Missouri
History of Springfield, Missouri
Child abuse incidents and cases
Violence against women in the United States
Incidents of violence against women
June 2015 crimes in the United States
June 2015 events in the United States
2015 in Missouri
Female murder victims